Madhuca spectabilis is a tree in the family Sapotaceae. The specific epithet spectabilis means "spectacular", referring to the tree's appearance.

Description
Inflorescences bear eight or more flowers.

Distribution and habitat
Madhuca spectabilis is endemic to Borneo. Its habitat is lowland mixed dipterocarp forest from  altitude.

Conservation
Madhuca spectabilis has been assessed as endangered on the IUCN Red List. The species is threatened by logging and conversion of land for palm oil plantations.

References

spectabilis
Endemic flora of Borneo
Trees of Borneo
Plants described in 1960